Bayendar (also Romanized as Bāyendar and Bāyandor; also known as Rayindar) is a village in Mojezat Rural District, in the Central District of Zanjan County, Zanjan Province, Iran. At the 2006 census, its population was 25, in 7 families.

References 

Populated places in Zanjan County